The Sun Fire Office, later Sun Insurance, was founded in London in 1710 and developed into a leading international insurance business.  In 1959, Sun Insurance merged with Alliance Assurance to form Sun Alliance.

History

The Eighteenth Century

The Sun Fire Office was formed in 1710 when a group of 25 businessmen acquired an insurance company formed by one of them, Charles Povey, in 1708. Povey had been a pamphleteer and unsuccessful businessman. He had established a fire insurance company, the Exchange House Fire Office, in 1708 but after a takeover in 1710, he immediately fell out with his fellow directors and was forced to handover control.  For the first decade the level of business was small and erratic until, in 1720, a takeover bid brought in a new board of directors; they raised fresh capital in order to finance an increased level of business. The first county agent was appointed in Nottingham in 1721. By 1740 there were 51 agents and, in 1786, 123 ranging throughout England and Scotland. By the 1790s Sun Fire was dominant among the fire offices with premium income of over £100,000.

The Nineteenth Century

The early 1800s saw a slowdown in the rate of growth due to rising loss rates. In 1810, the directors decided to expand into life assurance but the original deeds only allowed for the acceptance of fire insurance. A separate company, the Sun Life Assurance Company, was formed and although it was legally distinct from the Fire Office, the two companies had identical boards of management. Before 1830, fire business was split equally between London and the provinces but by the 1880s more than 70 per cent was in the provinces. This was achieved by a huge increase in agencies, totalling over 800 by 1860 and over 1,200 by 1880. By then, Sun Fire was turning its attention to all forms of general insurance but, as was the case with life assurance, it was limited by the terms of its original deeds. This was overcome by a special Act of Parliament in 1891 which also saw a change in name to the Sun Insurance Office.

International Expansion

In 1836 the Sun made the decision to go overseas, its first target market being Germany, though the Great fire of Hamburg in 1842 "nearly strangled the infant overseas business at birth". In broad terms the development of overseas business before 1914 was primarily through agencies, although some policies were written from London. In the 1850, agencies were opened in the West Indies, South America, South Africa and the Far East. In the 1860s the emphasis was on France, Spain, Italy, the Ottoman Empire, Japan and the Philippines. Australia and New Zealand came in the 1870s followed by North America in the 1880s. The Sun was one of the last British companies to enter the United States on any scale but the region soon became the Sun's largest overseas market. This was effected by the 1885 acquisition of the Watertown Company, which operated in 30 states and through around 1,400 agencies. By the end of the 19th century, revenue from the USA equalled that of the home market. Canada was strengthened by the purchase of the Imperial Insurance Company in 1911.

The Twentieth Century

The 20th century saw an increase in the range of cover. In 1907 the Sun set up an accident department, reflecting the growth of mass transport and machines. Sun Insurance had been absent from one of the oldest markets, marine insurance and in 1921 it formed a marine department. This was enlarged by its 1931 acquisition of the Elder's Insurance Company of Liverpool and its 1938 agreement with the Royal Exchange Assurance to operate a joint marine underwriting account. Organisationally, Sun Insurance became a public limited company in 1926 and for the first time shareholders' liability was limited by law.

Further reading
 (extensive material on Povey)

References

Insurance companies of the United Kingdom
Insurance in the United Kingdom